Valentine Nekesa, is a Kenyan entrepreneur, designer and motivational speaker, who is the Founder of Nekesa Queens Limited, a company that she formed in 2014, at age 17.

Background and education
She was born and raised in Webuye, in Bungoma County, in western Kenya. Nekesa was raised by her mother. In 2009, Valentine's mother died when Valentine was only 12 years old.

Career
In 2008, at age 11 years when she was a student in Senior One, a friend asked her to make her an outfit so that she could participate in the school pageant. The friend was satisfied, and that encouraged the budding designer to design more outfits. While in high school, she continued to design outfits for different people.

In 2014, after high school. While waiting to enter university, a friend asked her to make her an outfit for an event. Valentine invested Sh1,000 (approx. US$10) and earned Sh1,500 (approx. US$15). Thus, her company VN Designs was created. A cousin, donated a sewing machine, so Valentine could make her outfits in-house.

In February 2017, at age 19 years, she entered a television reality show, sponsored by Safaricom. The eight-week show attracted 12 contestants and in the end Valentine Nekesa won. The prize was a cash prize of Sh3 million (approx. US$30,000) and Sh2 million (approx. 20,000) in services from participating Kenyan businesses. She intends to use her winnings to expand her business, which had three employees as of October 2017.

Other considerations
In October 2017, Valentine Nekesa was named among “The Top 40 Women Under 40 in Kenya 2017”, by Business Daily Africa, a daily English language business daily newspaper published by the Nation Media Group.

See also
 Esther Koimett
 Catherine Igathe
 Carole Kariuki

References

External links
 Meet Valentine Nekesa – Winner Of BLAZE BYOB TV Show 2017

1997 births
Kenyan models
Kenyan designers
21st-century Kenyan businesswomen
21st-century Kenyan businesspeople
Mount Kenya University alumni
Kenyan women business executives
Living people